Daniyar Mukanov (born 16 September 1978) is a retired Kazakhstani football defender.

Career statistics

International

References

External links 
 

Living people
1978 births
Kazakhstani footballers
Association football defenders
Kazakhstan international footballers
Kazakhstan Premier League players
FC Spartak Semey players
FC Zhetysu players
FC Vostok players
FC Tobol players
FC Aktobe players
FC Atyrau players